The following events took place in the year 2013 in Hungary.

Incumbents
President – János Áder 
Prime Minister – Viktor Orbán

Events

May 

 May 4, Jobbik members protested against the World Jewish Congress in Budapest, claiming that the protest was against "a Jewish attempt to buy up Hungary".

July 

 July 15, the government introduced a state monopoly on retail tobacco sales. So-called National Tobacco Shops throughout Hungary became the only places where people could purchase cigarettes.

Deaths

 June 19 – Gyula Horn, politician, Prime Minister of Hungary (1994–1998), (b. 1932)

See also
List of Hungarian films since 1990

References

 
Hungary
Hungary
Years of the 21st century in Hungary
2010s in Hungary